Paul Vermeiren (born 27 August 1963) is a Belgian archer. He competed at the 1988 Summer Olympics, the 1992 Summer Olympics and the 1996 Summer Olympics.

References

External links
 

1963 births
Living people
Belgian male archers
Olympic archers of Belgium
Archers at the 1988 Summer Olympics
Archers at the 1992 Summer Olympics
Archers at the 1996 Summer Olympics
People from Herentals
Sportspeople from Antwerp Province